The Couteret was a French automobile manufactured in Paris only in 1907.  The car was a front-wheel-drive voiturette.

References

Defunct motor vehicle manufacturers of France
Manufacturing companies based in Paris